George Vasey (February 28, 1822 – March 3, 1893) was an English-born American botanist who collected a lot in Illinois before integrating the United States Department of Agriculture (USDA), where he became Chief Botanist and curator of the greatly expanded National Herbarium.

Biography
George Vasey was born in 1822 near Scarborough, England, the fourth of ten children. His family emigrated to the United States the next year, and they established in Oriskany, New York. He left school at 12 to take a job as a store clerk.

He took interest in botany after borrowing and, since he could not afford the volume, manually copying a book on the subject. This interest was later encouraged after a chance encounter with Peter D. Knieskern, another naturalist who allowed Vasey to begin writing to various other botanists. Until 1870 he would maintain an extensive correspondence and collect a great many specimens both in Oneida County and later McHenry County, but did not publish material of scientific relevance until the 1870s.

Vasey married Martha Jane Scott in 1846, having graduated the same year from Berkshire Medical Institute with a M.D. degree, and shortly after they moved to establish themselves in Ringwood, Illinois. In 1854 he opened a dry good store to support his family of 7: four children and his mother. In 1858 he was a founding member of the Illinois Natural History Society, and over the next few years, began writing prolifically for the society and the Prairie Farmer. He had two more children by 1861, but in 1864 he lost his youngest to whooping cough. When his wife began to grow weaker, Vasey relocated the family to Richview, to no avail. Martha Vasey died in 1866.

After a brief period where he stopped writing, he remarried to a widow, but was beset with heavy financial trouble by the time John Wesley Powell invited him to participate in an expedition in 1868. Greatly enthused by the adventure, he dedicated himself to scientific pursuit. He briefly edited Entomologist and Botanist before being curator of the Illinois State University Natural History Museum. He resigned the latter position to succeed Charles Christopher Parry as the USDA Chief Botanist. He quickly began work to improve the poor state of the National Herbarium, then organized an exhibit of the country's trees for the Centennial Exposition. The herbarium, hosted by the Smithsonian Institution, is considered the crowning of his career, particularly its grass collection, of which he was a specialist; in 1889 the Institute named him Honorary Curator. As Chief Botanist he launched the Contributions from the United States National Herbarium. With George Thurber he worked on grasses for Asa Gray and John Torrey's Flora of North America.

He was granted an honorary M.A. in 1864 from Illinois Wesleyan University. In 1869 he was made a fellow of the American Association for the Advancement of Science, and in 1892, of the American Academy of Arts and Sciences; that same year he was representative to the 1892 International Botanical Congress in Genoa, where he was a vice-president. Of his published work his several-volumes monograph of the United States grass, the last part of which was published after his death, is one of the most notable, as are his 1884 Agricultural Grasses of the United States and his work to describe unpublished species who had accumulated in the herbarium, a work he completed less than a week before his death in 1893, from peritonitis. Three genera (Vaseya, now part of Muhlenbergia, Vaseyochloa, and Vaseyanthus), as well as numerous species were named after him, although it is not always clear whether they are named after himself or his son, George Richard Vasey, who collected widely after his father entered the USDA, and after which Rhododendron vaseyi is most likely named.

Works
Delineations of the Ox Tribe; or, the Natural History of Bulls, Bisons, and Buffaloes (London: G. Biggs, 1851)
A Descriptive Catalogue of the Native Forest Trees of the United States (Washington, 1876)
The Grasses of the United States, a Synopsis of the Tribes, with Descriptions of the Genera (1883)
Agricultural Grasses of the United States (1884)
A Descriptive Catalogue of the Grasses of the United States (1885)
Report of an Investigation of the Grasses of the Arid Districts (2 parts, 1886–87)
Grasses of the South (1887)
Grasses of the Southwest (1890–91)
Grasses of the Pacific Slope (1892–93)

Notes

References

 (with bibliography)

External links
 
 
 Works by Vasey at Biodiversity Heritage Library

American taxonomists
Agrostologists
1822 births
1893 deaths
United States Department of Agriculture people
Illinois State University people
Berkshire Medical College alumni
English botanists
English emigrants to the United States
People from Whitestown, New York
People from McHenry County, Illinois
Deaths from peritonitis
19th-century American botanists
Scientists from New York (state)
People from Scarborough, North Yorkshire